David Lewis (born 3 September 1964) is a former professional tennis player from New Zealand. He is a younger brother of 1983 Wimbledon finalist Chris Lewis and of Mark Lewis. He spent his childhood in Auckland and was educated at St Peter's College.

Career
Lewis and partner Tony Withers won the boys' doubles title in the 1981 Australian Open. He was a singles quarter-finalist in the boys' singles at the 1982 Australian Open and also won the New Zealand National Championships for the 18s age group that year.

Most successful as a doubles player, Lewis was a runner-up in the 1990 Geneva Open with Neil Borwick. He appeared in four Grand Slam tournaments and had his best showing at the 1988 Australian Open, where he and Ivo Werner made the round of 16.

He reached his only singles quarterfinal in 1986, at the Auckland ATP event. The following year, he had a win over the world No. 30, Jonas Svensson, in Wellington.

Lewis took part in seven Davis Cup ties for his country. Of his seven doubles rubbers, six of which were with Kelly Evernden, three were won. He won his only singles rubber against Wu Chang-rung of Taiwan.

Lewis is now coaching director of the South Carolina based Ivan Lendl International Junior Tennis Academy.

ATP career finals

Doubles: 1 (0–1)

Challenger titles

Doubles: 4

References

1964 births
Living people
New Zealand male tennis players
Australian Open (tennis) junior champions
Sportspeople from Lower Hutt
People educated at St Peter's College, Auckland
Tennis players from Auckland
Grand Slam (tennis) champions in boys' doubles